Elena Khatzisavva (born 17 August 1977) is a retired Cypriot rhythmic gymnast.

She competed for Cyprus in the rhythmic gymnastics all-around competition at the 1992 Summer Olympics in Barcelona. She was 42nd in the qualification round and didn't advance to the final.

References

External links 
 

1977 births
Living people
Cypriot rhythmic gymnasts
Gymnasts at the 1992 Summer Olympics
Olympic gymnasts of Cyprus